Ottilie Wilhelmine Roederstein (22 April 1859 – 26 November 1937) was a German-Swiss painter. She was the long-time companion of Elisabeth Winterhalter, one of the first female doctors in Germany.

Life 

Roederstein was born in Zürich, Switzerland. She was the second daughter of a businessman who came from Germany to work as a representative for a Swiss textile company.

She was first attracted to painting when the now-forgotten Swiss painter Eduard Pfyffer (1836–1899) came to their home to do family portraits. This interest grew with visits to local museums. For a woman, training as a painter would have gone against contemporary social conventions. Her mother was especially opposed to her wishes, but persistence eventually won over her father and, in 1876, she was allowed to study with Pfyffer, so she would be close to home.

Her talent for portrait painting soon became obvious and she quickly outgrew Pfyffer's studio. Her opportunity came when her sister Johanna married a businessman from Berlin. Johanna and her husband agreed to let her live with them there, and she found a place as a student in a special women's class given by Karl Gussow. In 1882, she had her first exhibition with an art dealer in Zürich and it was well received. That same year, she followed a friend to Paris, where she found a position in the studios of Carolus-Duran and Jean-Jacques Henner. By 1887, she was able to support herself with sales and commissions and no longer had to depend on her parents. She was a participant in the Salon and won a Silver Medal at the Exposition Universelle (1889). She exhibited her work at the Woman's Building at the 1893 World's Columbian Exposition in Chicago, Illinois.

After 1890, she moved to Frankfurt to be with her friend, Elisabeth Winterhalter; although she travelled widely (including a trip to Africa in 1913). She never lost track of her Swiss roots, however, and became an Honorary Citizen of Zürich in 1902. Five years later, she and Elisabeth settled in Hofheim am Taunus (a suburb of Frankfurt). Amongst her models was Gwen John who was intrigued that Roederstein wore a shirt, jacket and a fob watch. Roederstein's painting of her as "The Letter" was exhibited at the salon of the Société Nationale des Beaux-Arts in 1908. After the war she did a number of portraits of women widowed by the war. She continued to exhibit regularly until 1931.

Roederstein died on 26 November 1937 in Hofheim am Taunus.

References

Further reading 
 Clara Tobler: Ottilie W. Roederstein.  Rascher & Cie, Zürich 1929.
 Hermann Haindl: Ottilie W. Roederstein, eine Malerin in Hofheim. Magistrat und Kunstverein, Hofheim 1980. Exhibition catalog. 
 Barbara Rök: Ottilie W. Roederstein (1859–1937). Eine Künstlerin zwischen Tradition und Moderne.  Jonas, Marburg 1999 (Dissertation, Philipps-Universität Marburg, FB 09, 1997).
 Barbara Rök: „Ich arbeitete mit rastlosem Eifer“ - Ottilie Wilhelmine Roedersteins langer Weg zu einem eigenen Stil. In: Exhibition catalog, Ida Gerhardi – Deutsche Künstlerinnen in Paris um 1900. Städtische Galerie Lüdenscheid, 2012.

External links 

 
 
 
 Senckenburglische Portraitsammlung: Portrait of Elisabeth Winterhalter, with short biography

1859 births
1937 deaths
German women painters
Swiss women painters
Artists from Zürich
19th-century German painters
20th-century German painters
19th-century German women artists
20th-century German women artists
20th-century Swiss artists
19th-century Swiss artists
German lesbian artists